Of Love and Peace is an album by organist Larry Young. It was recorded in 1966 and was released by Blue Note Records in 1967.

Recording and music
The album was recorded at Van Gelder Studio, Englewood Cliffs, New Jersey, on July 28, 1966. "Of Love and Peace" and "Falaq" are largely free improvisations. The other tracks are cover versions of "Pavanne" and "Seven Steps to Heaven".

Releases and reception

Of Love and Peace was released by Blue Note Records. On CD, it was later issued as part of Mosaic Records's box set of Young recordings, then by Blue Note in 2004. The Penguin Guide to Jazz described it as "a fine effort which takes a mostly obscure band through some fascinating ideas". The AllMusic reviewer called it a "stimulating Blue Note date".

Track listing
 "Pavanne" (Morton Gould) - 14:11
 "Of Love and Peace" (Young) - 6:31
 "Seven Steps to Heaven" (Miles Davis/Victor Feldman) - 10:17
 "Falaq" (Young) - 10:09

Personnel
Larry Young – organ
Eddie Gale – trumpet
James Spaulding – flute on "Of Love and Peace", alto saxophone on remainder
Herbert Morgan – tenor saxophone
Wilson Moorman III – drums
Jerry Thomas – drums

References

Larry Young (musician) albums
1966 albums
Blue Note Records albums
Albums produced by Alfred Lion
Albums recorded at Van Gelder Studio